Wilmington is an unincorporated community in Wabaunsee County, Kansas, United States.

History
A post office was opened in Wilmington in 1857, and remained in operation until it was discontinued in 1906.

Education
The community is served by Mission Valley USD 330 public school district.

References

Further reading

External links
 Wabaunsee County maps: Current, Historic, KDOT

Unincorporated communities in Wabaunsee County, Kansas
Unincorporated communities in Kansas
1857 establishments in Kansas Territory